is a Japanese manga series written and illustrated by Chūya Koyama. It has been serialized in Kodansha's seinen manga magazine Morning since December 2007. A 99-episode anime television series adaptation by A-1 Pictures aired from April 2012 to March 2014. The manga was also adapted into a live-action film that premiered in May 2012. An anime film, Space Brothers #0, premiered in August 2014.

In 2011, Space Brothers won the general category at both, the 56th Shogakukan Manga Award and the 35th Kodansha Manga Award. As of March 2022, the manga had 28 million copies in circulation, making it one of the best-selling manga series.

Story

In the summer of 2006, Mutta Nanba and his younger brother, Hibito, witness what they believe to be a UFO, which flies off towards the Moon. Hibito decides he will go onto the Moon whilst Mutta decides he will aim for Mars. Nineteen years later, in the year 2025, Hibito has become a fully fledged JAXA astronaut assigned to go on a mission towards the moon. Mutta, on the other hand, has not been so successful in achieving his dreams. As Mutta eventually recalls his past ambitions, he receives a letter stating he has been accepted to join a JAXA training program for new astronauts. The series follows Mutta as he seeks to become an astronaut and achieve his longtime dream just like his brother did.

Media

Manga

Space Brothers, written and illustrated by Chūya Koyama, has been serialized in Kodansha's Morning since December 6, 2007. Kodansha has collected its chapters into forty-two tankōbon volumes as of December 2022.

The manga is available in digital form in North America and Europe from ComiXology and Amazon in both volume and SimulPub chapter format. It is also currently available in English as part of a read-only subscription from Crunchyroll and Kodansha USA.

Anime

A 99-episode anime television series adaptation by A-1 Pictures aired on Yomiuri TV from April 1, 2012, to March 22, 2014. It was simulcast by Crunchyroll. The series is licensed by Sentai Filmworks in North America. The 31st episode, which aired on November 4, 2012, features the first piece of voice acting to be recorded in space, performed by astronaut Akihiko Hoshide aboard the International Space Station. A special episode titled  was screened in planetariums during Summer 2012 and was released on DVD with the 20th manga volume on February 22, 2013.

Music
Opening themes
"Feel So Moon" by Unicorn (ep 1–13)
 by Sukima Switch (ep 14–26)
 by DOES (ep 27–38)
"Small World" by Fujifabric (ep 39–51)
 by Magokoro Brothers (ep 52–64)
 by Merengue (ep 65–75)
"HALO" by tacica (ep 76–87)
"B.B." by THE Yatou (ep 88–99)
Ending themes
 by Rake (ep 1–13)
 by Angela Aki (ep 14–26)
 by Akihisa Kondō (ep 27–38)
 by Motohiro Hata (ep 39–51)
"Beyond" by Miho Fukuhara (ep 52–64)
 by Flower Companyz (ep 65–75)
"New World" by Kasarinchu (ep 76–87)
"Anata ga Ireba OK!" by Serena (ep 88–99)

Films

Live action film
A live-action film adaptation of Space Brothers was produced by Toho and released in Japanese theatres on May 5, 2012, later being screened at the Japanese Film Festival in Australia later that year. The adaptation was written by Chuya Koyama and directed by Yoshitaka Mori, with Shun Oguri and Masaki Okada playing the roles of Mutta and Hibito respectively. Real life astronaut Buzz Aldrin plays a cameo in the film as himself. The theme song for the film is British alternative rock band Coldplay's "Every Teardrop Is a Waterfall" from their album Mylo Xyloto. The film won the "Best of Puchon" and "NH Nonghyup Citizen's Choice" awards at the 16th Puchon International Fantastic Film Festival.

Anime film
A prequel anime film titled Space Brothers #0 (Uchū Kyōdai #0 in Japanese) was released in Japanese theaters on August 9, 2014. Manga creator Chūya Koyama wrote the script for the film.

Reception
It has been nominated twice for the Manga Taishō, in 2009 and 2010. In 2011, it won the award for best general manga at the 56th Shogakukan Manga Awards and at the 
Kodansha Manga Award (shared with Chica Umino's March Comes In Like a Lion). In 2014, it won the Reader Prize of the 18th Tezuka Osamu Cultural Prize. As of March 2022, the manga had over 28 million copies in circulation.

An asteroid, 13163 Koyamachuya, was named after the creator.

References

Further reading

External links
  
  
  
 
 

2012 anime television series debuts
A-1 Pictures
Comedy anime and manga
Fiction set on the Moon
Films scored by Takayuki Hattori
Films scored by Toshiyuki Watanabe
Films with screenplays by Makoto Uezu
Hard science fiction
Kodansha manga
Live-action films based on manga
NASA in fiction
Science fiction anime and manga
Science fiction comedy
Seinen manga
Sentai Filmworks
Slice of life anime and manga
Television series about space programs
Television series set in the 2020s
Winner of Kodansha Manga Award (General)
Winners of the Shogakukan Manga Award for general manga
Works about astronauts
Yomiuri Telecasting Corporation original programming
Japanese science fiction films
Japanese comedy films